Sarah Guyot (born April 16, 1991 in Vannes, Morbihan) is a French sprint canoeist. Guyot is a member of Canoe Kayak Club Tours in Tours, and is coached and trained by Nicolas Maillot.  She began to canoe when she was 10, following an elder brother who also canoed at that time. 

Guyot represented France at the 2012 Summer Olympics in London, where she competed in the women's K-4 500 metres, along with her teammates Marie Delattre, Joanne Mayer, and Gabrielle Tuleu. Guyot and her team finished last in the final by more than a second behind the Russian team (led by Yuliana Salakhova), recording the slowest time of 1:35.299.

At the 2013 U23 World Championships, she won a gold medal in the K-1 500 m.

In 2014, the European U23 Championships were held in Mantes-en-Yvelines, France; Guyot won two gold medals on home water, the K-1 200 m and the K-1 500 m. 

At the 2016 Olympics, Guyot competed in the K-1 200 m, reaching the final, where she finished in 5th place.

In 2017, she graduated from her training in physiotherapy, allowing her to concentrate on canoeing.

References

External links
 
 
 NBC Olympics Profile

1991 births
French female canoeists
Living people
Olympic canoeists of France
Canoeists at the 2012 Summer Olympics
Canoeists at the 2016 Summer Olympics
Canoeists at the 2020 Summer Olympics
Sportspeople from Vannes
Mediterranean Games silver medalists for France
Mediterranean Games medalists in canoeing
Competitors at the 2018 Mediterranean Games
European Games competitors for France
Canoeists at the 2015 European Games
Canoeists at the 2019 European Games
21st-century French women